The Orofino Main Post Office, known also as U.S. Post Office – Orofino Main, located at 320 Michigan Ave. in Orofino in Clearwater County, Idaho, was listed on the National Register of Historic Places in 1989.  Its Moderne design is credited to Louis A. Simon.

It is a  three-story building on a raised basement with six bays on its front facade.

References

External links

Post office buildings on the National Register of Historic Places in Idaho
Moderne architecture in the United States
Government buildings completed in 1940
Clearwater County, Idaho
Post office buildings in Idaho